The illustrations for La Grande Bible de Tours are a series of 241 wood-engravings, designed by the French artist, printmaker, and illustrator Gustave Doré (1832–1883) for a new deluxe edition of the 1843 French translation of the Vulgate Bible, popularly known as the Bible de Tours.

La Grande Bible de Tours, issued in 1866, was a large folio ("grand in folio") edition published in two volumes simultaneously by Mame in Tours, France and by Cassell & Company in the United Kingdom in 1866. The French translation known as the Bible de Tours had originally been published in 1843 and was done by Jean Jacques Bourassé (1813–1872) and Pierre Désiré Janvier (1817–1888).

The illustrations were immensely successful and have been reproduced countless times worldwide, influencing the visual arts and popular culture in ways difficult to measure. The series comprises 139 plates depicting scenes from the Old Testament, including the deuterocanonical books, and 81 from the New Testament.

Background
Doré's artistic reasons for undertaking the Bible project are outlined by his biographer, Joanna Richardson:
It offered him an almost endless series of intensely dramatic events. His visions of the looming tower of Babel, the plague of darkness in Egypt, the death of Samson, Isaiah's vision of the destruction of Babylon; these vast, forbidding scenes, heavy with doom, remind one of the visions of John Martin. They also reveal many elements by now familiar in Doré's work: the mountain scenes, the lurid skies, the complicated  battles, the almost unremitting brutalism. Doré's illustrations of the Old Testament remind us, above all, of the God of Wrath: of massacres and murders, decapitations and avenging angels. There is, too, a period element: the angels are Victorian angels, full of sentiment; the women are, again, keepsake women, the children are Victorian children: sentimental or wise beyond their years.

The illustrations

The Old Testament

Deuterocanonical / Apocrypha

The New Testament

References

Prints based on the Bible
Biblical art
Cultural depictions of Adam and Eve
Cultural depictions of David
Cultural depictions of Moses
Judith in art
Prints depicting the Crucifixion of Jesus
Annunciation in Christian art
Flight into Egypt in art
John the Baptist in art
Paul the Apostle in art
19th-century prints
Catholic engraving
Grande Bible de Tours